The rate of living theory postulates that the faster an organism’s metabolism, the shorter its lifespan. The theory was originally created by Max Rubner in 1908 after his observation that larger animals outlived smaller ones, and that the larger animals had slower metabolisms. After its inception by Rubner, it was further expanded upon through the work of Raymond Pearl. Outlined in his book, The Rate of Living published in 1928, Pearl conducted a series of experiments in drosophila and cantaloupe seeds that corroborated Rubner’s initial observation that a slowing of metabolism increased lifespan.

Further strength was given to these observations by the discovery of Max Kleiber’s law in 1932. Colloquially called the “mouse-to-elephant” curve, Kleiber’s conclusion was that basal metabolic rate could accurately be predicted by taking 3/4 the power of body weight. This conclusion was especially noteworthy because the inversion of its scaling exponent, between 0.2 and 0.33, was the scaling for lifespan and metabolic rate.

Mechanism

Mechanistic evidence was provided by Denham Harman's free radical theory of aging, created in the 1950s. This theory stated that organisms age over time due to the accumulation of damage from free radicals in the body.  It also showed that metabolic processes, specifically the mitochondria, are prominent producers of free radicals. This provided a mechanistic link between Rubner's initial observations of decreased lifespan in conjunction with increased metabolism.

Current state of theory

Support for this theory has been bolstered by studies linking a lower basal metabolic rate (evident with a lowered heartbeat) to increased life expectancy.  This has been proposed by some to be the key to why animals like the giant tortoise can live over 150 years.

However, the ratio of resting metabolic rate to total daily energy expenditure can vary between 1.6 and 8.0 between species of mammals. Animals also vary in the degree of coupling between oxidative phosphorylation and ATP production, the amount of saturated fat in mitochondrial membranes, the amount of DNA repair, and many other factors that affect maximum life span. Furthermore, a number of species with high metabolic rate, like bats and birds, are long-lived. In a 2007 analysis it was shown that, when modern statistical methods for correcting for the effects of body size and phylogeny are employed, metabolic rate does not correlate with longevity in mammals or birds.

See also

 DNA damage theory of aging

References 

Rubner, M. (1908). Das Problem der Lebensdauer und seiner beziehungen zum Wachstum und Ernährung. Munich: Oldenberg.
Raymond Pearl. The Rate of Living. 1928

Theories of biological ageing
Metabolism